Culladia dentilinealis is a moth in the family Crambidae. It was described by George Hampson in 1919. It is found in the Punjab region of what was then India and in Nepal.

References

Crambini
Moths described in 1919
Moths of Asia